Harris County may refer to:

 Harris County, Georgia, southwest of Metro Atlanta
 Harris County, Texas, the primary county of the Greater Houston metropolitan area